Rewe is a village and civil parish in the county of Devon in England. The Reading to Plymouth railway line also passes through the village, but there has never been a station here; the nearest operating station is Exeter St Davids. Before its closure, Stoke Canon station was the nearest.

The parish church is the Church of St. Mary the Virgin, built around 1450 in the Perpendicular Gothic style.

Up Exe Halt railway station was on the Exe Valley Railway Line, which closed in 1963.

External links
 Kelly's Directory of Devonshire, 1902. Quoted by genuki.
Rewe CP (Parish), Neighbourhood Statistics, Office for National Statistics.
Rewe Parish Church on the Netherexe Parishes site.

Villages in Devon
Civil parishes in Devon